The Beyrichienkalk Formation is a geologic formation in Gotland, Sweden. It preserves fossils dating back to the Silurian period. The formation is represented in erratic boulders found in:
 Oderberg, Brandenburg, Germany
 Voigtsdorf, Mecklenburg-Western Pomerania, Germany
 Międzyzdroje, West Pomerania, Poland
 Orłowo, Poland
 Vistula River, Bydgoszcz, Kuyavia-Pomerania, Poland

Fossil content 
The following fossils have been reported from the formation:

Cephalopods
 Spyroceras damesi

See also 

 List of fossiliferous stratigraphic units in Germany
 List of fossiliferous stratigraphic units in Poland
 List of fossiliferous stratigraphic units in Sweden

References

Bibliography

Further reading 
 2010 - Schallreuter and Hinz-Schallreuter - Die Nodibeyrichien des Beyrichienkalkes (The Nodibeyrichians of the Beyrichia Limestone) - Geschiebekunde aktuell 26 (4): 119-134, 8 Abb., 1 Tab. Hamburg/Greifswald November 2010 

Geologic formations of Sweden
Geology of Germany
Geology of Poland
Silurian System of Europe
Silurian Sweden
Pridoli geology
Limestone formations
Shallow marine deposits
Silurian southern paleotropical deposits
Paleontology in Germany
Paleontology in Poland